Conus virgo is a species of sea snail, a marine gastropod mollusk in the family Conidae, the cone snails and their allies.

These snails are predatory and venomous. They are capable of "stinging" humans, therefore live ones should be handled carefully or not at all.
Varieties
 Conus virgo var. alba Spalowsky, 1795: synonym of Conus virgo Linnaeus, 1758
 Conus virgo var. fasciata Menke, 1828: synonym of Conus lividus Hwass in Bruguière, 1792

Description
The size of the shell varies between 50 mm and 151 mm. The solid shell is rounded below the shoulder-angle. The spire is flatly convex, slightly striate throughout, more distinctly at the base. The color of the shell is pale yellowish brown, tinged with violet at the base.

Distribution
This marine species occurs in the Red Sea and in the tropical Indo-West Pacific off Tanzania, Madagascar, Aldabra, Chagos, the Mascarene Islands; India, the Philippines and Australia (Northern Territory, Queensland, Western Australia).

References

  Linnaeus, C. (1758). Systema Naturae per regna tria naturae, secundum classes, ordines, genera, species, cum characteribus, differentiis, synonymis, locis. Editio decima, reformata. Laurentius Salvius: Holmiae. ii, 824 pp 
 Reeve, L.A. 1843. Monograph of the genus Conus. pls 1–39 in Reeve, L.A. (ed.). Conchologica Iconica. London : L. Reeve & Co. Vol. 1.
 Demond, J. 1957. Micronesian reef associated gastropods. Pacific Science 11(3): 275–341, fig. 2, pl. 1
 Cotton, B.C. 1964. Molluscs of Arnhem Land. Records of the American-Australian Scientific Expedition to Arnhem Land 4 (Zoology): 9–43
 Wilson, B.R. & Gillett, K. 1971. Australian Shells: illustrating and describing 600 species of marine gastropods found in Australian waters. Sydney : Reed Books 168 pp. [
 Salvat, B. & Rives, C. 1975. Coquillages de Polynésie. Tahiti : Papéete Les editions du pacifique, pp. 1–391.
 Cernohorsky, W.O. 1978. Tropical Pacific Marine Shells. Sydney : Pacific Publications 352 pp., 68 pls.
 Wilson, B. 1994. Australian Marine Shells. Prosobranch Gastropods. Kallaroo, WA : Odyssey Publishing Vol. 2 370 pp. 
 Röckel, D., Korn, W. & Kohn, A.J. 1995. Manual of the Living Conidae. Volume 1: Indo-Pacific Region. Wiesbaden : Hemmen 517 pp.
 Higo, S., Callomon, P. & Goto, Y. 1999. Catalogue and Bibliography of the Marine Shell-bearing Mollusca of Japan. Japan : Elle Scientific Publications 749 pp.

External links
 The Conus Biodiversity website
 Cone Shells – Knights of the Sea
 

virgo
Molluscs of the Indian Ocean
Molluscs of the Pacific Ocean
Fauna of the Red Sea
Gastropods of Asia
Molluscs of Oceania
Fauna of Southeast Asia
Least concern biota of Asia
Least concern biota of Oceania
Gastropods described in 1758
Taxa named by Carl Linnaeus